The Diocese of Tonga (Latin: Dioecesis Tongana) is a Latin Church ecclesiastical territory or diocese of the Catholic Church in Tonga. It was erected as part of the Vicariate Apostolic of Central Oceania in 1842, had subsequent name changes in 1937 and 1957 before being elevated to the Diocese of Tonga on June 21, 1966. Its cathedra is found in the Cathedral of the Immaculate Conception  (Tongan: Malia Tupu 'Imākulata) in the capital Nuku'alofa. It is immediately exempt to the Holy See and not part of an ecclesiastical province.

On 4 January 2015, Pope Francis announced that he would make Tonga's bishop, Soane Patita Paini Mafi, a cardinal on 14 February of that year.

History
Along with the rest of the country, in the early Twenty-First Century the tiny Catholic community of some 15,000 has been considered threatened with the loss of its home due to climate change.

Bishops

Ordinaries
Pierre Bataillon, S. M. (1842–1863) 
Aloys Elloy, S. M. (1872–1878) 
Jean-Amand Lamaze, S. M. (1879–1906) 
Armand Olier, S. M. (1906–1911) 
Joseph-Félix Blanc, S. M. (1912–1952) 
John Hubert Macey Rodgers, S.M. (1953–1972), appointed Titular Bishop of Caput Cilla
Patelisio Punou-Ki-Hihifo Finau, S. M. (1972–1993) 
Soane Lilo Foliaki, S. M. (1994–2008)
Soane Patita Paini Mafi (2008– ), elevated to Cardinal in 2015

Coadjutor bishops
, S.M. (1842-1847), as Coadjutor vicar apostolic; did not succeed to see; appointed Vicar Apostolic of Melanesia (in fact Nouvelle-Calédonie, New Caledonia), Pacific (Oceania)
Aloys Elloy, S.M. (1863-1877), as Coadjutor vicar apostolic
Armand Olier, S.M. (1903-1906), as Coadjutor vicar apostolic
Patelisio Punou-Ki-Hihifo Finau, S.M. (1971-1972)
Soane Patita Paini Mafi (2007-2008); future Cardinal

Coat of arms 
The coat of arms was designed by Marek Sobola, a heraldic artist from Žilina (Slovakia), who also made the diocesan seal and flag. These are based on the Tonga flag and a Fleur-de-lis, symbol of the Immaculate Conception in Christian iconography. The coat of arms was adopted officially on September 21, 2017.

References

External links

See also
List of Roman Catholic dioceses in Oceania

Tonga
Catholic Church in Tonga